Jungfernbach is a small river of Hesse, Germany. It flows into the Ahne in Kassel.

See also

List of rivers of Hesse

Rivers of Hesse
Rivers of Germany